Carl Fredrik af Wingård (born 26 September 1781 in Stockholm, died 19 September 1851) was a Swedish Lutheran archbishop of the Church of Sweden, Professor at Uppsala University, and politician. He served as Archbishop of Uppsala 1839–1851. He was also holder of seat 10 in the Swedish Academy.

Biography

His noble title (af) was added to his family name Wingård already in 1799, as he was the son of a bishop, Johan Wingård, who became his predecessor in the Diocese of Gothenburg. He was cousin to the poet Johan Börjesson.

Af Wingård studied at the Uppsala University and eventually became professor there in 1810. In 1818 he was ordained priest and 8 July 1818 he became bishop of Gothenburg.

From all reports, af Wingård seems to have been a humanistic teacher and professor, gentle and caring, especially towards students.

Af Wingård was active against alcoholism among priests, and was one of the founders of the Temperance Society of Gothenburg, established in 1830. He also founded the Swedish Mission Society in 1835, an organization for missions work among the Sámi people, together with Methodist missionary George Scott, industrialist Samuel Owen, priest Johan Olof Wallin, Count Mathias Rosenblad, and others. He served as president of Pro Fide et Christianismo, a Christian education society.

He was elected a member of the Royal Swedish Academy of Sciences in 1838.

Distinctions
  Order of the Seraphim
  Commander of the Order of the Polar Star

References

Sources 
 Nordisk familjebok, article Wingård In Swedish

1781 births
1851 deaths
Politicians from Stockholm
Lutheran archbishops of Uppsala
19th-century Lutheran archbishops
Members of the Swedish Academy
Members of the Royal Swedish Academy of Sciences
Bishops of Gothenburg
Swedish temperance activists